Bai Gang (born 20 March 1961) is a Chinese retired para table tennis player. He won a silver medal at the 2008 Summer Paralympics.

He is a polio survivor. He began his para table tennis career when he was 39.

References

1961 births
Living people
Table tennis players at the 2008 Summer Paralympics
Paralympic medalists in table tennis
Medalists at the 2008 Summer Paralympics
Chinese male table tennis players
Paralympic silver medalists for China
Paralympic table tennis players of China
Table tennis players from Shaanxi
Sportspeople from Xi'an
People with polio
20th-century Chinese people
21st-century Chinese people